Arifur Rahman Rabin is a Bangladeshi cricketer. He made his List A debut for Prime Bank Cricket Club in the 2016–17 Dhaka Premier Division Cricket League on 1 June 2017.

References

External links
 

Year of birth missing (living people)
Living people
Bangladeshi cricketers
Prime Bank Cricket Club cricketers
Place of birth missing (living people)